EXIN is a Dutch company which certifies IT professionals worldwide. In addition, EXIN accredits (training and examination) organizations in the field of ICT training and the development of ICT training materials. EXIN is active in more than 165 countries and provides examination in many languages. Since EXIN Was founded in 1984, it has assessed and certified more than two million professionals. EXIN’s headquarters are situated in Utrecht, The Netherlands.

History 
EXIN was founded in 1984 on the initiative of the Ministry of Economic Affairs, with the task of thoroughly and independently examining the education program Automation and Mechanization of the Administrative Information Processing (AMBI).

In the 90’s, EXIN introduced several other certification programs, such as the “Praktijkdiploma Informatica” (PDI) and the “Information Service Procurement Management” (ISPL). In 2005, EXIN switched from the AMBI program to the modular and practical I-TRACKS (since 2010 called TRAKCS). EXIN is one of the founding partners for the development and dissemination of ITIL®. Meanwhile, EXIN offers wide range of certifications for professionals in the ICT field, from basic to expert levels. Since 2010, EXIN develops certification programs with reference to the e-Competence Framework (e-CF). IN 2017, EXIN collaborated with BCS, APMG and VanHaren Publishing to launch a new IT Service Management framework: VeriSM.

EXIN examines both through partners and examination centers, as well as through the digital service EXIN Anywhere. Using Marking-on-the-Spot technology (for iOS and Android), EXIN is able to examine exams remotely.

In 2014, EXIN launched the new service e-Competence Solutions. Besides offering Self-Scans, EXIN also offers Self-Assessments, Soft Skills Assessments and Professional Assessments to Professionals, HR-experts, organizations and candidates. All these assessments are based on the e-Competence Framework. In addition, by using the EXIN Quality Labels, EXIN is able to make the training and competence frameworks of companies compliant with the e-Competence Framework. In 2021, EXIN was acquired by technology company Software Improvement Group

References

External links
Dutch EXIN website
International EXIN website

Companies established in 1984
Information technology companies of the Netherlands
Organisations based in Utrecht (city)
Companies based in Utrecht (province)